Attapeu, also written as Attopu or Attapu, is the capital of Attapeu province, Laos. Its official name is Muang Samakhi Xay. It is the southernmost of provincial capitals in Laos.

Most of the inhabitants are Lao Loum. The temple of Wat Luang Muang Mai in the town centre was built in 1939 and is notable for original naga barge boards. A monument dedicated to Kaysone Phomvihane was erected near the temple.

Transport
The airport opened in May 2015 but did not receive flights until April 2016, when Lao Airlines introduced flights from Vientiane via Pakse. However, the airline withdrew from the market in October 2016 due to low demand. TTR Weekly attributed the airport's condition to the lack of nearby tourist attractions, even though commercial activity has risen due to Attapeu's proximity to Vietnam.

See also 
 Kingdom of Champasak

References

Sources
 

Populated places in Attapeu province
Provincial capitals in Laos
Populated places established in 1560